The Squadron Sinister is a supervillain team appearing in American comic books published by Marvel Comics. The Squadron Sinister first appeared in the final panel of The Avengers #69 (October 1969), created by Roy Thomas and Sal Buscema. The team is a pastiche of DC's Justice League.

Publication history
The first version of the Squadron Sinister is formed by the Elder of the Universe known as the Grandmaster as pawns to battle the champions of the time-traveling Kang the Conqueror, the superhero team the Avengers. The Grandmaster creates four villains—Doctor Spectrum, Hyperion, Nighthawk, and the Whizzer—to face heroes Iron Man, Thor, Captain America and Goliath (Clint Barton). In interviews, Thomas and Jerry Bails have stated that the Squadron was based on the DC Comics superhero team the Justice League of America, evoking the DC characters Green Lantern, Superman, Batman and the Flash.

Fictional character biography

Grandmaster's Squadron Sinister
The limited series Squadron Supreme, written by Mark Gruenwald, explains that the Grandmaster creates the Squadron Sinister modeling them  on the already-existing Squadron Supreme of the Earth-712 universe. The similarities also caused confusion in Marvel's production department, as the covers of The Avengers #85 (February 1971) and #141 (November 1975) "cover-blurbed" appearances by the Squadron Sinister, when in fact it was the Squadron Supreme that appeared in both issues.

The Avengers eventually defeat the Squadron and the Grandmaster abandoned them as a result. The Squadron reappear in the title The Defenders, reunited by the alien Nebulon. The villains receive greater power in exchange for Earth, and create a giant laser cannon in the Arctic to melt the polar ice caps, thereby covering the entirety of Earth's surface in water. The superhero team the Defenders are alerted to the scheme by Nighthawk and defeat the villains and Nebulon, with Nighthawk reforming and joining the Defenders the following issue.

After this defeat the three remaining members of the Squadron Sinister are teleported off-world by Nebulon, returning with an energy-draining weapon. The villains plan to threaten Earth again, but are defeated once more by the Defenders and the Avenger Yellowjacket. During another brief encounter with several members of the Avengers, who seek a way to separate Doctor Spectrum's Power Prism from fellow Avenger the Wasp, the characters are revealed to have disbanded.

While Nighthawk becomes an ongoing character featuring regularly in the Marvel Universe, two of the other members of the Squadron make isolated appearances. Hyperion appears in the title Thor, battling the hero once again, and features in Marvel Two-in-One in an encounter with the Thing. Hyperion also travels to the Earth-712 universe and, after impersonating the Squadron Supreme's Hyperion for a time, dies in a heated battle with his counterpart. The title The Amazing Spider-Man showcases the Whizzer's return, where he returns to crime with a new costume and the alias the Speed Demon.

Resurrected Squadron Sinister 
The Grandmaster reappears and reforms the Squadron Sinister: an apparently resurrected Hyperion; a new Dr. Spectrum (Alice Nugent, a former lab assistant of Hank Pym), Nighthawk and the Speed Demon, who have both had bad experiences with superhero team the New Thunderbolts. Courtesy of a phenomenon known as the Wellspring of Power – an interdimensional source of superhuman abilities – the Grandmaster increases the Squadron Sinister's powers and they battle the New Thunderbolts. Thunderbolts team leader Baron Zemo defeats the Grandmaster and, in the ensuing chaos, the Squadron Sinister scatter and escape.

Other versions

The Last Defenders
The limited series The Last Defenders briefly features warped versions of Hyperion, Doctor Spectrum and the Whizzer. The trio are created by long-time Defenders foe Yandroth when confronted by Nighthawk. Together with a futuristic version of the Defenders, Nighthawk defeats the doppelgängers, who subsequently disappear.

Secret Wars (2015)
During the Secret Wars storyline, alternate versions of the Squadron Sinister characters reside in Battleworld's Utopolis domain. Led by their Hyperion, they have been annexing various domains of Battleworld in order to grow their territory. They started by destroying the Squadron Supreme of the Supremia Province where they left their Nighthawk alive to be the Supremia Province's puppet ruler for Hyperion. Then they made the World War II-themed domain of Europix part of their domain upon it surrendering after the Squadron Sinister saved Europix from the Frightful Four of Wittland.  However, due to manipulations on the part of Nighthawk, Whizzer is executed by Hyperion for treason, and Doctor Spectrum flees when framed for the murder of one of the Thor Corps. When Warrior Woman is blackmailed into leaving Utoplolis, Nighthawk is revealed to possess Spectrum's power prism. Nighthawk then makes his move, poisoning Hyperion with argonite before fighting him on even footing with the Prism. Hyperion eventually succumbs to argonite poisoning, allowing Nighthawk to finish Hyperion off. Nighthawk is arrested by the Thors and, with testimony from Warrior Woman, sentenced to exile. He presumably meets his fate against a horde of Ultron drones, leaving Warrior Woman the sole remaining member of the team.

Members
 Doctor Spectrum (Alice Nugent)
 Hyperion (Zhib-Ran)
 Nighthawk (Kyle Richmond)
 Whizzer (James Sanders)

Former members
 Doctor Spectrum (Billy Roberts)
 Doctor Spectrum (Kinji Obatu)
 Hyperion construct

See also 
 Imperial Guard — Marvel superhero team originally created as a pastiche of DC's Legion of Super-Heroes

References

External links
 Squadron Sinister at the Marvel Universe
 
 

1969 comics debuts
Characters created by Roy Thomas
Characters created by Sal Buscema
Comics characters introduced in 1969
Marvel Comics supervillain teams
Squadron Supreme